Darrell Steven Steinberg (born October 15, 1959) is an American politician and attorney who is the 56th mayor of Sacramento, California since December 2016. He was elected to be mayor on June 7, 2016 (avoiding a runoff). Before that, he was California Senate President pro Tempore and the leader of the majority party in the California State Senate from 2008 to 2014.

Steinberg was a Democratic member of the California State Senate representing the  6th District. He had also previously served as a member of the California State Assembly (1998–2004) and as a member of the Sacramento City Council (1992–1998).

Early life, education and early career

Born in San Francisco to a Jewish family, Steinberg graduated from Capuchino High School in Millbrae-San Bruno, California, and from University of California, Los Angeles where he earned a BA in economics. He then earned a Juris Doctor from University of California, Davis School of Law.

He served as an employee rights attorney for the California State Employees Association for 10 years before his work as an Administrative Law Judge and mediator. He has continued to mediate disputes of public interest during his tenure as mayor. In 2022, he mediated a dispute between the National Union of Healthcare Workers and Kaiser Permanente, and was appointed to mediate between the University of California and the United Auto Workers during the 2022 University of California academic workers' strike. He also was once a UAW member.

California State Assembly
Steinberg was a member of the California State Assembly from 1998 until he was termed out in 2004. During his time in the Assembly he served as chair of the Assembly Committees on Budget, Appropriations, Judiciary, Labor and Employment, and the Select Committee on High Priority Schools. He authored 80 bills that were signed into law in areas that included mental health, K-12 education, foster care, and workplace safety. Steinberg is considered a strong advocate for children and mental health issues. He opposed mandatory arbitration clauses.

Steinberg authored legislation to focus additional educational resources on high-poverty schools and make them more accountable for improvement. He authored several laws to improve the state's foster care system, including measures to improve system accountability and educational stability. His legislation in foster care included AB 408, which mandated steps to help older foster youth find permanent homes and families. He also passed AB 34, the first significant expansion of community mental health programs in more than a decade.

Steinberg also authored AB 1127, a landmark bill to give stronger prosecutorial power to district attorneys to address serious and willful violations of Cal/OSHA regulations that result in worker injuries and deaths. Some supporters called this legislation "the Tosco bill" because of an accident that occurred at the Tosco Refinery near Martinez, California in 1999. The accident, which resulted in four deaths, was held up as an example of insufficient penalties for dangerous workplace-safety violations.

State Senate

Steinberg was the President pro Tempore of the California State Senate from 2008 to 2014. In February 2008, he was selected by Senate Democrats to become Pro Tem in the next legislative session, when the incumbent would be termed-out. He took office in November 2008 as the first Senate leader from Sacramento since 1883.

Before being elevated to Pro Tem, he was Chair of the Senate Natural Resources and Water Committee.  He also chaired the Senate Select Committee on High School Graduation., the Mental Health Services Oversight and Accountability Commission, and the Legislative Blue Ribbon Commission on Autism.

As a member of the State Senate, Steinberg continued many of the same causes he had undertaken as a member of the Assembly. He continued his work on improving test scores, aiding under performing schools, lowering dropout rates, and improving the state's mental health system.  In 2007, Steinberg introduced a bill to cap at 20 the number of hours high school students can work after school if their grade point average is not 2.5 or higher.

On November 13, 2013, State Sen. Ron Calderon, lashed out at Federal authorities claiming that they wanted him to record conversations between Sen. Steinberg and fellow Sen. Kevin De Leon in a sting operation targeting Steinberg and De Leon.

Mental healthcare advocate
Throughout his legislative career, Steinberg has been a strong advocate for mental health care. He has called it "the under-attended issue in our time and in our society". He is known within the mental health community as a long time champion.

Steinberg became passionate about mental health during his time on the Sacramento City Council. In 1997, the City of Sacramento engaged in a lawsuit against Loaves and Fishes, a private charity providing food to the homeless. The free lunches began to draw thousands of homeless people which had become a nuisance to local business near the shelter in North Sacramento. Former Mayor Joe Serna and then Councilmember Steinberg were the only two members to vote against the lawsuit. Upon further investigation into the rapidly increasing homeless population, Steinberg discovered that an overwhelming portion of homeless suffered from mental illness and did not have access to proper mental health care. He took up working on ways to help solve this issue.

AB 34 pilot projects
During his first year in the State Assembly, Steinberg authored AB 34, which began three pilot projects that provided integrated services to the homeless in Stanislaus, Los Angeles and Sacramento counties. The pilot was so successful in lowering hospitalization, incarceration and homeless episodes the program was expanded to more than 30 counties in late 2000 as AB 2034. Data collection by the pilot programs demonstrated the success of the services being provided.

Mental Health Services Act
Steinberg authored Proposition 63, the California Mental Health Services Act, approved by California voters on the November 2004 statewide ballot. The act imposes a 1% tax on incomes of $1,000,000 or more for mental health funding. He co-authored "Prop 63" with advocate Sherman Russell Selix, Jr. In the first five years, the program has provided mental health care to 400,000 Californians.

The Mental Health Services Act includes a "whatever-it-takes" approach to support services for people with severe mental illness and is the first of its kind in the United States. Services can include providing a safe place to live, a job, help in school, physical health care, clothing, food, or treatment when a mental illness and a substances abuse disorder are combined. These are examples of full service partnerships which have been proven to be effective in helping people with severe mental illness transition successfully to independent living situations.

The Act also provides Prevention and Early Intervention services (PEI). PEI improves mental health care treatment by creating programs in places where mental health services are not traditionally given, such as schools, community centers and faith-based organizations. The intent of PEI programs is to engage individuals before the development of serious mental illness or serious emotional disturbance or to alleviate the need for additional or extended mental health treatment.

The Mental Health Services Act has proven to be a cost-effective way to address mental health care. A 2012 report found that every dollar spent of mental health services in California saved roughly $0.88 in costs to criminal justice and health, and housing services by reducing the number of arrests, incarcerations, ER visits, and hospitalizations.

Mayor of Sacramento (2016—present)

Tenure 
In 2021, Steinberg backed a legislative proposal that would make Sacramento the first city in California to end zoning that permits only the construction of one single-family home. The proposal was intended to deal with the housing shortage and skyrocketing rents in California.

In June 2021, Steinberg was one of 11 U.S. mayors to form Mayors Organized for Reparations and Equity (MORE), a coalition of municipal leaders dedicated to starting pilot reparations programs in their cities.

Personal life
Steinberg is married to his wife Julie and has two children: daughter Jordana and son Ari. They live in the Pocket-Greenhaven neighborhood of Sacramento.

Electoral history

City Council

State Assembly
1998

2000

2002

2004

State Senate
2006

2010

Mayor

See also
 List of mayors of the 50 largest cities in the United States

References

External links
State Senate website
November 2010 interview at qu3stions.com
Interview on PMAKid.com

Join California Darrell Steinberg

|-

|-

|-

|-

1959 births
21st-century American politicians
Democratic Party California state senators
Jewish mayors of places in the United States
Lawyers from Sacramento, California
Lawyers from San Francisco
Living people
Mayors of Sacramento, California
Democratic Party members of the California State Assembly
Politicians from San Francisco
Sacramento City Council members
UC Davis School of Law alumni
University of California, Los Angeles alumni
Jewish American state legislators in California
21st-century American Jews